His Excellency, The Shop Assistant is a 1933 Polish romantic comedy film directed by Michał Waszyński.

Cast
Eugeniusz Bodo ...  Jurek Czermoński, the shop assistant 
Konrad Tom ...  Mr. Porecki 
Mieczysława Ćwiklińska ...  Mrs. Idalia Porecka 
Ina Benita ...  Ania Porecka 
Wiktor Biegański ...  Warehouse Director 
Andrzej Bogucki   
Helena Buczyńska   
Zygmunt Chmielewski ...  Kracht 
Feliks Chmurkowski   
Ewa Erwicz  
Ludwik Fritsche...  The Valet 
Zofia Kajzerówna   
Henryk Rzętkowski   
Irena Skwierczyńska ...  Acting Director 
Zofia Ślaska   
Stefan Szczuka   
Alina Żeliska

References

External links 
 
 

1933 films
1930s Polish-language films
Polish black-and-white films
Films directed by Michał Waszyński
1933 romantic comedy films
Polish romantic comedy films